Vikramabâhu I (ruled 1111–1132) was a medieval king of Sri Lanka. He was the son of king Vijayabahu I and the Queen Thilokasundari who was a Kalinga princess. He was the "Mapa"("Maha Arya Pada" or prince successor) who ruled the Ruhuna on behalf of the king during king Jayabâhu I's reign.

After the death of king Jayabâhu I, there were many conflicts due to the conspiracy by Vikramabâhu I's aunt, the sister of king Vijayabahu I, Miththa, to give the throne to her son while Vikramabâhu I was in Ruhuna.  However, Vikramabâhu who was the rightful ruler who was able to gain the throne while his aunt and her sons fled the country.

See also
 Mahavamsa
 List of monarchs of Sri Lanka
 History of Sri Lanka

References

External links
 Kings & Rulers of Sri Lanka
 Codrington's Short History of Ceylon

Monarchs of Polonnaruwa
V
V
V